Coleman Ruben Escovedo (born August 30, 1981) is an American former mixed martial artist from Fresno, California. He was the inaugural WEC Featherweight Champion.

Mixed martial arts career

Health issues
Escovedo was forced into a well documented semi-retirement in 2007 from a serious staph infection that left him partially paralyzed and in need of spinal surgery. Then, after a nearly three years hiatus from mixed martial arts action, he returned on May 8, 2009, at a Palace Fighting Championship event at the Tachi Palace Hotel and Casino in Lemoore, California. Escovedo's comeback to MMA was his first fight in the 135 lb Bantamweight division.

Ultimate Fighting Championship
Escodevo made his UFC debut against Renan Barão on May 25, 2011, at UFC 130. He lost the fight via unanimous decision.

Escovedo faced Takeya Mizugaki at UFC 135. He was knocked out by Mizugaki at 4:30 in the second round, giving him two consecutive losses in the UFC.

Escovedo faced Alex Caceres on November 12, 2011, at UFC on Fox 1. Escovedo lost via unanimous decision (30-27, 30–27, 30–27) after losing the standing exchanges to Caceres for all three rounds.

On December 16, 2011, Escovedo announced via the UG forums that he had been released by the UFC.
Author Zac Robinson has written a book titled "Through The Cage Door" about Escovedo's life and career and its expected release date was August 2014.

Championships and accomplishments
Tachi Palace Fights
TPF Bantamweight Championship (One time)
World Extreme Cagefighting
WEC Featherweight Championship (One time; First)

IFC Champion 145

Tachi Palace Fights
Native American Champion

Mixed martial arts record

|-
| Loss
| align=center| 17–9
| Alex Caceres
| Decision (unanimous)
| UFC on Fox: Velasquez vs. Dos Santos
| 
| align=center| 3
| align=center| 5:00
| Anaheim, California, United States
| 
|-
| Loss
| align=center| 17–8
| Takeya Mizugaki
| TKO (punches)
| UFC 135
| 
| align=center| 2
| align=center| 4:30
| Denver, Colorado, United States
| 
|-
| Loss
| align=center| 17–7
| Renan Barão
| Decision (unanimous)
| UFC 130
| 
| align=center| 3
| align=center| 5:00
| Las Vegas, Nevada, United States
| 
|-
| Win
| align=center| 17–6
| Steven Siler
| Technical Submission (triangle choke)
| Showdown Fights: New Blood
| 
| align=center| 1
| align=center| 2:30
| Orem, Utah, United States
| 
|-
| Loss
| align=center| 16–6
| Michihiro Omigawa
| Submission (straight armbar)
| Dream 16
| 
| align=center| 1
| align=center| 2:30
| Nagoya, Japan
| 
|-
| Loss
| align=center| 16–5
| Michael McDonald
| KO (punches)
| TPF 5: Stars and Strikes
| 
| align=center| 2
| align=center| 1:12
| Lemoore, California, United States
| 
|-
| Win
| align=center| 16–4
| Yoshiro Maeda
| KO (head kick)
| Dream 13
| 
| align=center| 1
| align=center| 2:29
| Yokohama, Japan
| 
|-
| Win
| align=center| 15–4
| Jeff Bedard
| Submission (triangle choke)
| TPF 3: Champions Collide
| 
| align=center| 1
| align=center| 2:31
| Lemoore, California, United States
| 
|-
| Win
| align=center| 14–4
| Maurice Eazel
| TKO (head kick and punches)
| Strikeforce Challengers: Gurgel vs. Evangelista
| 
| align=center| 1
| align=center| 1:47
| Fresno, California, United States
| 
|-
| Win
| align=center| 13–4
| Tyler Weathers
| Decision (split)
| Disturbing the Peace
| 
| align=center| 3
| align=center| 5:00
| Fresno, California, United States
| 
|-
| Win
| align=center| 12–4
| Michael McDonald
| TKO (punches)
| PFC 13: Validation
| 
| align=center| 2
| align=center| 2:25
| Lemoore, California, United States
| 
|-
| Loss
| align=center| 11–4
| Antonio Banuelos
| Decision (unanimous)
| WEC 23: Hot August Fights
| 
| align=center| 3
| align=center| 5:00
| Lemoore, California, United States
| 
|-
| Loss
| align=center| 11–3
| Jens Pulver
| KO (punch)
| International Fight League: Legends Championship 2006
| 
| align=center| 1
| align=center| 0:56
| Atlantic City, New Jersey, United States
| 
|-
| Loss
| align=center| 11–2
| Urijah Faber
| TKO (corner stoppage)
| WEC 19
| 
| align=center| 2
| align=center| 5:00
| Lemoore, California, United States
| 
|-
| Win
| align=center| 11–1
| Joe Martin
| Submission (flying triangle choke)
| WEC 17
| 
| align=center| 1
| align=center| 1:05
| Lemoore, California, United States
| 
|-
| Win
| align=center| 10–1
| Poppies Martinez
| TKO (leg injury)
| WEC 15
| 
| align=center| 2
| align=center| 1:05
| Lemoore, California, United States
|
|-
| Win
| align=center| 9–1
| Randy Spence
| Submission (triangle choke)
| International Fighting Championships: Eve Of Destruction
| 
| align=center| 1
| align=center| 2:06
| Salt Lake City, Utah, United States
| 
|-
| Win
| align=center| 8–1
| Anthony Hamlett
| TKO (punches)
| WEC 8
| 
| align=center| 2
| align=center| 1:30
| Lemoore, California, United States
| 
|-
| Loss
| align=center| 7–1
| Bao Quach
| Decision (unanimous)
| Gladiator Challenge 15
| 
| align=center| 2
| align=center| 5:00
| Porterville, California, United States
| 
|-
| Win
| align=center| 7–0
| Noah Shinable
| Submission (triangle choke)
| Gladiator Challenge 14
| 
| align=center| 1
| align=center| 1:38
| Porterville, California, United States
| 
|-
| Win
| align=center| 6–0
| Philip Perez
| Submission (triangle choke)
| WEC 5: Halloween Havoc
| 
| align=center| 1
| align=center| 3:07
| Lemoore, California, United States
| 
|-
| Win
| align=center| 5–0
| Christian Allen
| TKO (punches)
| Ultimate Athlete 3: Vengeance
| 
| align=center| 2
| align=center| 3:16
| Denver, Colorado, United States
| 
|-
| Win
| align=center| 4–0
| Paul Morris
| Submission (triangle choke)
| WEC 3
| 
| align=center| 1
| align=center| 0:29
| Lemoore, California, United States
| 
|-
| Win
| align=center| 3–0
| Jay Valencia
| Submission (triangle choke)
| Ultimate Athlete 2: The Gathering
| 
| align=center| 1
| align=center| 0:45
| Cabazon, California, United States
| 
|-
| Win
| align=center| 2–0
| Bart Palaszewski
| Submission (punches)
| Ultimate Athlete 1: The Genesis
| 
| align=center| 1
| align=center| 2:10
| Hammond, Indiana, United States
| 
|-
| Win
| align=center| 1–0
| Terry Dull
| Submission (triangle choke)
| WEC 2
| 
| align=center| 1
| align=center| 1:54
| Lemoore, California, United States
|

References

External links
Official UFC Profile

American male mixed martial artists
Mixed martial artists from California
Bantamweight mixed martial artists
Featherweight mixed martial artists
Mixed martial artists utilizing Brazilian jiu-jitsu
American mixed martial artists of Mexican descent
World Extreme Cagefighting champions
1981 births
Living people
Ultimate Fighting Championship male fighters
American practitioners of Brazilian jiu-jitsu